A Bend in the Road is the fifth novel by the American author Nicholas Sparks, who also wrote the romance love novels A Walk to Remember, The Notebook, and The Rescue. It was published in 2001. The story was inspired by Sparks's brother-in-law, Bob.

Plot summary 

Miles Ryan's life seemed to end the day his wife Missy was killed in a hit-and-run accident two years ago. As deputy sheriff of New Bern, North Carolina, he not only grieves for her and worries about their young son Jonah but longs to bring the unknown driver to justice. Then Miles meets Sarah Andrews, Jonah's second grade teacher. A young woman recovering from a difficult divorce, Sarah moved to New Bern hoping to start over. Tentatively, Miles and Sarah reach out to each other... soon they are falling in love. But what neither realizes is that they are also bound together by a shocking secret, one that will force them to reexamine everything they believe in- including their love.

Characters

Miles Ryan 

Miles lived in New Bern his whole life and married his high school sweetheart, Missy. The death of Missy caused Miles grief for many years especially because it was a hit-and-run accident. He felt lonely and was not happy without a partner in his life. He is a loving father that would do anything for his son Jonah. He is the deputy sheriff at New Bern. Eventually, he starts a new relationship with Sarah Andrews and they both have strong feelings for each other. After a while he returned to his obsession with his wife’s case because he had some new information.

Jonah  

He is a sweet seven-year-old boy who loves to spend time with his friends. Since he was really young when his mother died he does not really understand what happened. The only thing he knows is that his mom was never coming back. After his mother died he started having nightmares from which he woke up screaming and crying. The death of his mother also affected his grades at school. Other teachers let him fall behind because of what happened but Sarah decided to help him. After spending some time with Sarah he starts to like her and by the end of the novel he already viewed her as someone similar to his mom.

Brian 

At the beginning of the story the killer is an unknown person. Miles was always obsessed with finding an answer so when someone told him that Otis Timson bragged about killing Missy he did not think twice and tried to arrest him. Eventually, Sarah's brother, Brian, tells her that he was the killer but explains that everything was an accident. Sarah thinks about how to tell Miles and when she finally does Miles is furious and wants to punish Brian. After hearing Brian's version of the story he went back to the crime scene and discovered that Brian's story might be true. He later followed Brian to the cemetery and made him promise that he would do something important with his life, and eventually lets him go free. Brian later became an emergency room physician and had saved six lives.

Point of view 

The novel is written in third person and there are some chapters in which it turns to first person and Missy's killer narrates his version of what happened.

References

External links 

 A Bend In The Road by Nicholas Sparks, RTÉ review

2001 American novels
Novels by Nicholas Sparks
American romance novels
Novels set in North Carolina